Erigeron breviscapus is a Chinese species of flowering plants in the family Asteraceae. It has been found only in China, in the provinces of Guangxi, Guizhou, Hunan, Sichuan, Tibet, and Yunnan.

Erigeron breviscapus is a perennial, clump-forming herb up to 50 cm (20 inches) tall, though in some cases less than 1 cm (0.4 inches) tall. Its flower heads have blue, purple, or white ray florets surrounding yellow disc florets.

References

breviscapus
Flora of China
Plants described in 1903